Dom Antônio Reis ("Dom Antônio Reis - Brazilian bishop") is a bairro in the District of Sede in the municipality of Santa Maria, in the Brazilian state of Rio Grande do Sul. It is located in south Santa Maria.

Villages 
The bairro contains the following villages: Dom Antônio Reis, Parque Residencial Dom Antonio Reis, Seminário São José.

References 

Bairros of Santa Maria, Rio Grande do Sul